Coppenrath Verlag GmbH & Co KG is a German publishing house based in Münster, in the North Rhine-Westphalia region of Germany. It publishes primarily children's and young people's literature, together with various non-book and marketing products. The publisher has also worked with Rolf Zuckowski in 2001. Coppenrath is known for its production of Advent calendars.

History 

Divisions 

The Coppenrath publishing group publishes in four divisions. This series began in 2001 with fairy-tales; the first was the Italian story of Pinocchio. As of 2022, more than sixty have been published. The books are square, with a 12 × 12 cm format.

In 1992, Coppenrath began to sell children's games under the brand , "The Mirror-Castle".
A number of games have been nominated for the children's section of the German "Spiel des Jahres" award, or appeared in its list of recommended games:
  (Captain Sharky - the Adventure of the Treasure Island) by Kai Haferkamp was nominated in 2008.

The Hölker Verlag forms a third division, founded in 1972, and publishing regional cookery books, as well as modern books about food.

The remaining division, the Bohem Verlag, was founded in 1973 and publishes poetic picture-books.

External links 

 Website der Coppenrath Verlag GmbH & Co KG

References 

1768 establishments in Europe